André António Rosário Teles (born 6 April 1997 in Funchal) is a Portuguese footballer who plays for Marítimo as a midfielder.

Football career
On 18 May 2013, André Teles made his professional debut with Marítimo B in a 2015–16 Campeonato de Portugal match against Camacha. On 13 October 2019, André Teles made his first appearance for the Marítimo first team in a 2–1 defeat to Sporting Braga in the Taça da Liga. Two weeks later Teles made his first appearance in the Primeira Liga, coming on as a 90th minute substitute in a 1–1 draw with Porto.

References

External links

1997 births
Living people
Sportspeople from Funchal
Portuguese footballers
Association football defenders
Primeira Liga players
Campeonato de Portugal (league) players
C.S. Marítimo players